Blessed Francis Xavier Seelos Catholic Church, formerly St. Vincent de Paul Church, is a church in New Orleans listed on the National Register of Historic Places.  The parish was founded in 1838 as the third parish in the city.  The original parish boundaries intersected those of St. Louis Cathedral, New Orleans and served the French community.  In fact, the French tradition was so strong that sermons were not given in English until the 1880s.  In later years, its parish boundaries overlapped the boundaries of Holy Trinity Church, which served German residents.

The church was originally housed in a wood frame building built in 1838. In 1866, a red brick building was built, in the basilica plan, and the original frame building became a school.  The church added a clock tower in 1924.

In 2001, as part of a study of parish facilities, the Roman Catholic Archdiocese of New Orleans announced that five parishes in the area would be merged into one parish.  Annunciation, St. Cecilia, St. Gerard (a parish for the hearing-impaired), Sts. Peter and Paul, and St. Vincent de Paul were merged into a new parish, Blessed Francis Xavier Seelos.  The new church was located in the church and facilities of St. Vincent de Paul.  On May 25, 2003, the building was severely damaged by a fire.  The main altar was destroyed, along with several murals and the sacristy.  As part of the repairs, the former altar from Sts. Peter and Paul Church was moved to Blessed Seelos Parish, along with the pulpit from St. Cecilia.  Hurricanes Katrina and Rita caused further damage to the nearby St. Gerard Center (the former Motherhouse of the Sisters of the Immaculate Conception), forcing the church to replace the roof.

References

Religious organizations established in 1838
Roman Catholic churches in New Orleans
Churches on the National Register of Historic Places in Louisiana
Roman Catholic churches completed in 1866
19th-century Roman Catholic church buildings in the United States
Roman Catholic churches completed in 1924
1838 establishments in Louisiana
National Register of Historic Places in New Orleans